Takayuki Kanamori (金森 敬之, born July 24, 1985 in Fujiidera, Osaka) is a former Japanese professional baseball pitcher.

External links

NPB

1985 births
Living people
Japanese baseball players
Nippon Professional Baseball pitchers
Hokkaido Nippon-Ham Fighters players
Chiba Lotte Marines players
People from Fujiidera, Osaka